Nanjing Week is a city promotion event sponsored by the Nanjing Provincial People's Government. The organizer has selected a world-renowned city each year to promote Nanjing’s characteristics, landscape, history and culture since 2015, and expect to promote bilateral cultural exchanges,the event last for a week.

Since 2019,Nanjing Week merged with Nanjing Tech Week,became the international venues of Nanjing Tech Week.

History

References

Annual events in China